Standing Rock is an indian reservation in North Dakota and South Dakota.

Standing Rock may also refer to:
Standing Rock, Alabama, a census-designated place and unincorporated community in Chambers County
Standing Rock, Kentucky, an unincorporated community in Lee County
Standing Rock of Eufaula, a landmark submerged with the creation of Lake Eufaula in Oklahoma